Maryland's Legislative District 6 is one of 47 districts in the state for the Maryland General Assembly. It covers part of Baltimore County.

Demographic characteristics
As of the 2020 United States census, the district had a population of 128,766, of whom 98,958 (76.9%) were of voting age. The racial makeup of the district was 79,430 (61.7%) White, 26,074 (20.2%) African American, 1,143 (0.9%) Native American, 2,777 (2.2%) Asian, 34 (0.0%) Pacific Islander, 9,149 (7.1%) from some other race, and 10,146 (7.9%) from two or more races. Hispanic or Latino of any race were 14,299 (11.1%) of the population.

The district had 78,127 registered voters as of October 17, 2020, of whom 15,680 (20.1%) were registered as unaffiliated, 23,619 (30.2%) were registered as Republicans, 37,295 (47.7%) were registered as Democrats, and 931 (1.2%) were registered to other parties.

Political representation
The district is represented for the 2023–2027 legislative term in the State Senate by Johnny Ray Salling (R) and in the House of Delegates by Robin L. Grammer Jr. (R), Robert B. Long (R) and Richard W. Metzgar (R).

References

Baltimore County, Maryland
06
06